The 12th African Swimming Championships were held October 16–23, 2016 in Bloemfontein, (South Africa). 

Competition location was the Stadium Swimming Pool  in Bloemfontein.

Participating countries
Countries which sent teams were:

Medal standings
Final medal standings for the 2016 African Swimming Championships are:

Results

Men

Women

Mixed

Open water race

External links 
“2016 CANA African swimming championships” 2016 African Swimming Champs Results
 “XII CANA African swimming championships”

African Swimming Championships
Swimming competitions in South Africa
2016 in South African sport
2016 in African sport
International sports competitions hosted by South Africa